Gery-Nikol Nikolaeva Georgieva (born 30 July 1998), better known mononymously as Gery-Nikol, is a Bulgarian recording artist who rose to fame in late 2014 after participating in the third season of the singing competition X Factor Bulgaria.

Career
Gery-Nikol was born on July 30, 1998 in Varna, Bulgaria.

In 2014, she auditioned in the Bulgarian version of the reality show The X Factor as part of the Sweet 16 girl band alongside Hristina Hristova and Mishel Straminski. During the show they received mentorship by Bulgarian rapper Krisko. They left the competition after being eliminated in the seventh live show.

In 2015, a few months after her departure from The X Factor, Gery-Nikol signed a record deal with the Bulgarian-German label Facing The Sun. She began her solo career shortly, following the release of her debut single "Ela I Si Vzemi" ("Come and Get It") featuring her former X Factor Bulgaria mentor Krisko. The song quickly peaked the Bulgarian charts during the summer of 2015 and enjoyed successful commercial performance throughout the rest of the year. In late 2015 she revealed her second single "Momiche Kato Men" ("Girl Like Me"), supported by a music video. Both videos of the two singles were watched by a record number of viewers on the VBOX7 and YouTube video platforms.

In 2016, her impact was followed-up by the songs "I'm The Queen" on April 3 and "Gotina & Luda" on December 20 ("Cool and Crazy"). Both singles were also accompanied with two English versions directed towards an international audience, the second of which was renamed specifically to "One of a Kind" for the upcoming target group.

On July 20, 2017, Gery-Nikol premiered her fifth overall single "Naprao Gi Ubivam", which features fellow Varna-based rapper 100 Kila.

Discography

Singles

As lead artist

Music videos

Personal life
In 2015 the Bulgarian State Agency for Child Protection lodged a complaint against Gery-Nikol's music video for "Momiche Kato Men" for depicting and promoting obscene content. A few months later, the Bulgarian Council of Electronic Media refused to consider the case due to lack of legal norms.

Gery-Nikol has several times cited Rihanna as her biggest idol and musical influence.

References

External links
 Official website
 FacingTheSun

1998 births
Living people
Musicians from Varna, Bulgaria
Bulgarian pop singers
21st-century Bulgarian women singers
X Factor (Bulgarian TV series)